Runcible Jones: The Gate to Nowhere is the first novel of the Runcible Jones Quintet featuring the magical adventures of Runcible Jones and his fey friend Mariam Orpiment, written by the author Ian Irvine.

Plot summary
Set in an alternate modern-day Earth where magic is known to exist but is forbidden to all, The Gate to Nowhere tells the story of twelve-year-old Runcible Jones, a young boy whose father died during an explosion while writing a book about magic, and whose mother is currently imprisoned for attempting to protect said book. Despite his social problems, Runcible inadvertently manages to befriend a girl named Mariam. However, when an unexpected and desperate accident involving Runcible's powers transport the two to the dangerous world of Ilitor, the duo are forced to cooperate to survive in their harsh new surroundings. But when a chance encounter with a mysterious sorceress ends with both of them being cast away into the wilds of Ilitor, it is only through the help of the shady Sleeth and their strange new friends (and enemies), that they will be able to return home to Earth, and see their families again.

External links 

 

2006 novels
Australian young adult novels
Novels by Ian Irvine
Young adult fantasy novels
2006 children's books